The Gurgura, Gorgorah or Gurgure is a northern Somali clan, a sub-division of the Dir clan family.

Overview 

As a Dir sub-clan, the Gurgura have immediate lineal ties with the Akisho, Gadabuursi,  Issa, the Surre (Abdalle and Qubeys), the Biimaal (who the Gaadsen also belong to), the Bajimal, the Bursuk, the Madigan Dir, the Garre (the Quranyow sub-clan to be precise as they claim descent from Dir), Gurre, Gariire, other Dir sub-clans and they have lineal ties with the Hawiye (Irir), Hawadle, Ajuran, Degoodi, Gaalje'el clan groups, who share the same ancestor Samaale.

Distribution 
The Gurgura are the majority clan in the Erer district in the Sitti Zone. Gurgure founded lived around and founded the city of Dire Dawa. Today the Gurgure live in Dire Dawa, Somali Region of Ethiopia, Harar region, Djibouti, Somaliland, Somalia, and the Afar Region.

History

Origins 
The Gurgura are a Somali clan who inhabit the area surrounding Dire Dawa, Harar and the Awash Valley. The Gurgura are a Somali tribe who were politically claimed by the Oromos after the various Ethiopian governments have weakened the Gurgura in the region, and the original name of the tribe was Mohamed Madaxweyne Dir. The Gurgure are a vast tribe and stretch from Balawa (near Jijiga) to the Awash region; they also extend onto areas to the south where they established settlement of Sheikh Hussein Bale. They are associated with the spread of Islam. According to folklore collected from Dire Dawa region, During an earlier time, the Gurgure were established traders of Ifat and Adal. The arrival of the Oromo tribes from the south caused great disruption for both the Muslim tribes and the Christian Abyssinians. After the Muslim and Christians exhausted themselves with their ongoing wars; the newly arrived Oromos entered Ifat/Adal region (i.e. Dire Dawa & Jijija region). The arrival of the Oromo tribes such as the Ala, Itu, and Oborra) [see John Spencer Trimingham Islam in Ethiopia] caused renewed conflict. A small Oromo tribe called the Nole, that arrived in the region before the other Oromos, suffered from a full scale attack from the Itu, Ala, and Oboraa Oromos. The Somali Gurgura decided to save the Nole from these attacks. According to Gurgura elders from Dir Dawa; such Abdullahi Gareicho, recall that Gurgure wadaads advised the Gurgure warriors to wage war on the Oromo Itu, Ala, & Oborra, for three days only. After the three days they must stop. The Gurgura wages a successful war against the newly arrived Oromos and saved the Nole - from that day onwards the small Nole tribes agreed to become allies of the Gurgura and pay blood money with them. The Nole are a small group and they do not extend beyond Dire Dawa. 
The Gurgura (Mohamed Madaxweyan Dir) belong to the oldest section of Somalis. The ruined towns excavated on the Ethiopian Somalis boarder by A. T Curle reveal the sophistication of ancient towns associated with Gurgura Dir saints. The Gadabuursi town of Awbare is one of the largest and is named after Sheikh Awbare, a famous leader of Ifat/Adal, who was of the Nabidur subclan of the Gurgura. Another Gadabuursi ancient settlement known as Awbube is also named after a Gurgura saint called Sheikh Awbube who was a famous Ifat era saint. The great trading abilities of the Gurgure and their association with the spread of Islam has resulted in them being very widespread. The Gurgure are in continuous conflict with the encroaching Isa tribe. During the reig of Haille Selassie, the Isa were not present in Dire Dawa beyond a well now know as 'hafad Isa.' The nubers of Isa only increased during the reign of Mengistu; this was a period when the Gurgure were severely oppressed by the Mengistu regime. The Origin and History of the Somali People by Ibrahim Ali [ISBN 0 951 8924 5 2] identifies the warriors who fought Amda Seyon (1314 to 1344) with the Gurgura. The description of these warriors tying themselves together and then rushing into battle is identical to the battle practices of the Gurgura - "first the Beidoor Gurgura are sent in battle, and when we draw the first blood, it means we are guaranteed victory." [ref Origin & History of Somali People, by I. Ali]. The Gurgura and Madaxweyna Dir tribes are closely associated with introducing Islam to the Horn of Africa. Many ancient sheikhs as believed to belong to the Madaxweyna Dir clan - examples are Sh. Auboba, Sh. Aubare, Sh Barkhadle ("Blessed Father" Yusuf bin Ahmad al-Kawneyn (b. 10th century) and many more. Every Somali when he or she counts the stars starts with "Xidigga kow kamel Gurgura" - this alloudes to the Somali folklore of the Gurgura climbing mount ELmas in search of the Camel in the Sky - this story indicates the early introdcution of the camel to the Horn of Africa by the Gurgura.

History 
The Gurgure are mentioned in the Futuh Al Habasha : Conquest of Abyssinia as source dating back as far as the 16th century, by author: Shihabudin Ahmad bin Abd al-Qadir 'Arab Faqih or Arab Faqih. It is recorded that the Gurgure were among the famous Somali spearmen led by their chief Garad Abdi who fought alongside Ahmed Gurey or Ahmad ibn Ibrahim al-Ghazi with thirty knights and one-thousand foot-soldiers .

The city of Dire Dawa was originally called Diri Dhaba and used to be part of the Sultanate of Ifat and Adal Sultanate during the medieval times and was exclusively settled by Dir clan (Gurgure, Issa and Gadabuursi). After the weakening of Adal Sultanate, the Oromos took advantage and were able to penetrate through the city and settle the surrounding areas. Through marriage the Oromo assimilated some of the local Gurgure into their tribe.

Patrick Gilkes (2003) mentions the Gurgura as one of the clans that participated in the Futuh Al Habasha : Conquest of Abyssinia:

In his book Across Widest Africa: An Account of the Country and People of Eastern, Central and Western Africa As Seen During a Twelve Months' Journey from Djibuti to Cape Verde, Volume 2, written in 1905,'' Arnold Henry Savage Landor describes the Gurgura as a Somali tribe that he encountered on his to Harar from Djibouti in and around Dire Dawa and back towards Abyssinia. The authors refers to the land between Dire Dawa and Harar as Gurgura. The author says he met the Gurgura in great numbers with their spears, looking after sheep and camels. Landor''' describes the Gurgura possessing a skin of a deep chocolate colour, and divided them into two distinct types: one with wholly hair, or twisted into curls; the other not so common, with smooth hair, which is always left long and reaches the shoulders. Some grew a slight beard upon the cheeks and chin. The author goes on to say that they all had eyes the iris of which was of a deep brown, but that portion of the eye-ball which is white was dark yellowish tone.

Landor writes about making a camp near hot springs on his way to Abyssinia today known as Erer hot springs in the Sitti Zone of Somali Region. There he met the Hawiya, like the Gurgura, who speak somali, and some also understand the Galla (Oromo) language. The author describes the Hawiya, the Ghedebursi (Gadabuursi), Issa, Gurgura, Haberual (Habar Awal) and Dahrot (Darod) as speaking Somali.

Oromo political organizations sought to coerce the Gurgure, who were also another tribe in Dire Dawa who  speak the Oromo language (Oromiffa), to identify themselves as Oromo, though they belong to and identified as Dir Somalis. Oromo elders claimed that "the Gurgura people who speak the Oromo language belong to the Oromo nation and they only started to identify themselves with the Somali after the 1974 change of the Haile Selassie regime" though Somali's strongly disagree.

Gurgure Political Organization

The Gurgure fought for the Somalis rebels during the Ethiopian Civil War and supported the annexation of Dire Dawa, they actively participated in the Issa and Gurgure Liberation Front and clashed with the Oromo Liberation Front on numerous occasions for control over Dire Dawa.

Issa Gurgure Libration Front (IGLF) was active until 1991 it was led by an Issa Mr.Riyaale Ahmed
Independent Gurgure Libration Front (GLF) was founded by Member of Parliament Abdi Aziz Gurgure who is former Ethiopian Ambassador to Ivory Coast.
Horiyaal Democratic Party was a Gadaburis led political Party in Ethiopia with their Dir Issa and Gurgure, however; several attempts to unite the three with other Somali tribes didn’t fall through.

Clan tree

Gurgure are subdivided into seven major subtribes. Kundhuble, Gufaatile, Sanceele, Sanaye, Nibidoor, Bicida, and Gacalwaaq.

Dir
Madaxweyne 
Gurgure (Mohamed)
Habr Daar
Kundhuble
Ali
Abdulle
Dudub
Quwaxade
Gufaatile
Sanceele
Sanaye
Liiban
Nibidoor
Biciida
Gacalwaaq

Notable Gurgure People
Ugaas Buux Gaiid(52nd Ugaas of Gurgure and one of Dir Dhabah’s most notable figures)
Ugaas Gadiid Abdullahi Ugaas Buux (53rd Ugaas of Gurgure)
Ugaas Siyad Daud Cumar (54th and current Ugaas)
AbduWahab Sh. Abdiwali (former Colonel in the Somali National Army, Politician and prominent Gurgure leader well known by Dire Dawa residents and in Somali Region. 
Shiekh Macalin Qaasim Xaaji-Maxamed (well known shiekh of Somaliland who taught the likes of former president Silaanyo of Somaliland) 
Cabdiaziz Gurgure (MP, former Ethiopian Ambassador to Ivory Coast, Saudi Arabia, Kuwait and among other countries)

References

Somali clans in Ethiopia